The West Sierra League is a high school athletic league that is part of the CIF Central Section.

Members
 Avenal High School
 Firebaugh High School
 Coalinga High School
 Mendota High School
 Dos Palos High School
 Tranquillty High School

References

CIF Central Section